The 1955 Major League Baseball season was contested from April 11 to October 4, 1955.  It featured 16 teams, eight in the National League and eight in the American League, with each team playing a 154-game schedule.  In the World Series the Brooklyn Dodgers defeated the New York Yankees 4 games to 3.

For the third consecutive season, a franchise changed homes as the Philadelphia Athletics moved to Kansas City and played their home games at Municipal Stadium.

Standings

American League

National League

Postseason

Bracket

Awards and honors

Baseball Hall of Fame
Frank Baker
Joe DiMaggio
Ted Lyons
Dazzy Vance
Gabby Hartnett
Ray Schalk
Most Valuable Player
American League: Yogi Berra, New York Yankees
National League: Roy Campanella, Brooklyn Dodgers
Rookie of the Year
American League: Herb Score, Cleveland Indians
National League: Bill Virdon, St. Louis Cardinals

Statistical leaders

Managers

American League

National League

Home Field Attendance

See also
1955 Nippon Professional Baseball season

References

External links
1955 Major League Baseball season schedule

 
Major League Baseball seasons